The 2019 Under-19 Asia Cup was the 8th edition of ACC Under-19 Cup. The cricket tournament was held in Sri Lanka from 5 to 15 September 2019. 8 teams participated in the tournament, including 5 full members and three qualifiers.

Teams

Squads

Group stage

Group A

Points table

Group B

Points table

Knockout stage

Bracket

Semi finals

Final

Statistics

Most runs

Final standings

References

Asian Cricket Council competitions